Admiral   was a career naval officer in the Imperial Japanese Navy during World War II.

Biography
Takasu was a native of Sakuragawa Village, (currently part of Inashiki, Ibaraki), and graduated from the 35th class of the Imperial Japanese Naval Academy, where his classmates included future admirals Nobutake Kondō and Naokuni Nomura.
 
Takasu was commissioned as a lieutenant in December 1913, serving on the battleship , followed by the cruiser . He attended the 17th class of the Naval Staff College and was promoted to lieutenant commander upon graduation in December 1919. On June 23, he was assigned as a military attaché to the United Kingdom and was promoted to commander in December of the same year. After his return to Japan in 1924, he served as executive officer on the cruiser . A year later, he was assigned as an instructor at the Naval War College and promoted to captain in December 1928, after which he received his first command, the cruiser  in 1929.

Takasu returned to England again in December 1930 to serve as military advisor on the ambassador’s staff. He served on the court marshal of the perpetrators of the May 15 Incident in 1932. He was promoted to rear admiral on November 15, 1934 and reassigned to head the 3rd Bureau of the Imperial Japanese Navy General Staff, which was in charge of military intelligence. An outspoken opponent to the Tripartite Alliance  between Imperial Japan, Nazi Germany, and Fascist Italy, he was a member of the naval faction led by Isoroku Yamamoto and Mitsumasa Yonai opposed to war with the western powers. From 1936-1937, he commanded the First Carrier Division, which was active in combat in the early stages of the Second Sino-Japanese War, and was a naval advisor to the fledgling state of Manchukuo in 1937. Promoted to vice admiral on November 15, 1938, he then became commandant of the Naval War College. He was assigned as commander of the IJN 5th Fleet on September 29, 1939.

On April 29, 1940, Takasu was awarded the Order of the Rising Sun, 1st class.

On November 15, 1940, Takasu was assigned to command the IJN 4th Fleet, and from August 11, 1941, the IJN 1st Fleet. As the military position of Japan became precarious in the Solomon Islands and other areas of the Southwest Pacific, Takasu was assigned to command the Southwest Area Fleet from September 15, 1942. The IJN 13th Air Fleet also came under his command from September 20, 1943. Promoted to full admiral on March 1, 1944, he was recalled to Japan on June 18, to assume the position of military councilor. However, he died of sickness only two months later and his grave is at the Aoyama Cemetery in Tokyo.

Notes

References
 Evans, David C. and Mark R. Peattie. (1997). Kaigun: Strategy, Tactics, and Technology in the Imperial Japanese Navy, 1887-1941. Annapolis, Maryland: Naval Institute Press. ;

External links

1884 births
1944 deaths
Imperial Japanese Navy admirals
Military personnel from Ibaraki Prefecture
Military personnel of the Second Sino-Japanese War
Recipients of the Order of the Rising Sun
Japanese admirals of World War II